The 1971 Minnesota Twins finished 74–86, fifth in the American League West. 940,858 fans attended Twins games, the fifth-highest total in the American League, the first time the Twins failed to attract over one million fans since moving to Minnesota.

Regular season 
Five Twins made the All-Star Game: first baseman Harmon Killebrew, second baseman Rod Carew, shortstop Leo Cárdenas, outfielder Tony Oliva, and pitcher Jim Perry.

On August 10, at Metropolitan Stadium, slugger Harmon Killebrew hit his 500th career home run, in the first inning off the Baltimore Orioles' Mike Cuellar.  He followed that in the sixth inning with his 501st, also off Cuellar.

Lead off batter César Tovar led the AL with 204 hits  and was second with 94 runs. Tony Oliva won his third batting title with a .337 average and led the AL with a .546 slugging percentage.  Harmon Killebrew hit 28 HR and 119 RBI. Rod Carew hit .307.

Jim Perry (17–17), Bert Blyleven (16–15), and Jim Kaat (13–14) were the Twins' best pitchers. Kaat won his tenth Gold Glove Award.

Shortstop Leo Cárdenas topped the AL with a .985 fielding percentage—the highest for an American League shortstop since records began in 1901.

Season standings

Record vs. opponents

Notable transactions 
 April 9, 1971: Dave Boswell was released by the Twins.
 June 8, 1971: 1971 Major League Baseball draft
Dave Edwards was drafted by the Twins in the 7th round.
Future NFL quarterback Joe Theismann was drafted by the Twins in the 39th round.
Glenn Borgmann was drafted by the Twins in the 1st round of the secondary phase.
 July 8, 1971: Paul Ratliff was traded by the Twins to the Milwaukee Brewers for Phil Roof.

Roster

Player stats

Batting

Starters by position 
Note: Pos = Position; G = Games played; AB = At bats; H = Hits; Avg. = Batting average; HR = Home runs; RBI = Runs batted in

Other batters 
Note: G = Games played; AB = At bats; H = Hits; Avg. = Batting average; HR = Home runs; RBI = Runs batted in

Pitching

Starting pitchers 
Note: G = Games pitched; IP = Innings pitched; W = Wins; L = Losses; ERA = Earned run average; SO = Strikeouts

Other pitchers 
Note: G = Games pitched; IP = Innings pitched; W = Wins; L = Losses; ERA = Earned run average; SO = Strikeouts

Tom Hall led the Twins in saves with 9.

Relief pitchers 
Note: G = Games pitched; W = Wins; L = Losses; SV = Saves; ERA = Earned run average; SO = Strikeouts

Awards and honors 
 Harmon Killebrew, Lou Gehrig Award

Farm system 

LEAGUE CHAMPIONS: Charlotte, St. Cloud

Notes

References 
Player stats from www.baseball-reference.com
Team info from www.baseball-almanac.com

Minnesota Twins seasons
Minnesota Twins season
Minnesota Twins